1W or 1-W may refer to:

1st meridian west

Roads
OR 1W; see Oregon Route 99W
SSH 1W (WA); see Washington State Route 104
Arkansas Highway 1W; see Arkansas Highway 1

Aircraft
AH-1W, a model of Bell AH-1 Cobra
AH-1W, a model of Bell AH-1 SuperCobra
PB-1W, a model of Boeing B-17 Flying Fortress
HR2S-1W, a model of Sikorsky CH-37 Mojave
XS2U-1W, a model of Vought XS2U

See also
Watt
Week
Win–loss record
W1 (disambiguation)